Vakhrushevo is a rural locality (a village) in Staroselskoye Rural Settlement, Vologodsky District, Vologda Oblast, Russia. The population was 7 as of 2002.

Geography 
Vakhrushevo is located 42 km west of Vologda (the district's administrative centre) by road. Romanovo is the nearest rural locality.

References 

Rural localities in Vologodsky District